Porozovo is a village in the  Zavolzhsky District, Ivanovo Oblast, Russia, Population: about 100 (2002 est.);

Geography
Located on the left bank of the river Volga. Nearby locations: Zavolzhsk, Boristsevo, Vozdvizhenie, Yablonka. The direct bus service to Zavolzhsk, from Vozdvizhenie.

Gallery

External links
 Map of District

Rural localities in Ivanovo Oblast